Men's 400m races for wheelchair athletes at the 2004 Summer Paralympics were held in the Athens Olympic Stadium. Events were held in three disability classes.

T52

The T52 event consisted of 2 heats and a final. It was won by Toshihiro Takada, representing .

1st Round

Heat 1

Heat 2

Final Round

T53

The T53 event consisted of 3 heats and a final. It was won by Hamad Aladwani, representing .

1st Round

Heat 1

Heat 2

Heat 3

Final Round

T54

The T54 event consisted of 3 heats and a final. It was won by Kenny van Weeghel, representing .

1st Round

Heat 1

Heat 2

Heat 3

Final Round

References

M